Chirosia is a genus of root-maggot flies in the family Anthomyiidae. There are over fifty described species in Chirosia.

Species
These 58 species belong to the genus Chirosia:

C. aberrans Collin, 1955 c g
C. abundepilosa (Hennig, 1974) c g
C. aconiti (Ringdahl, 1948) c g
C. albifrons Tiensuu, 1938 c g
C. albitarsis (Zetterstedt, 1845) c g
C. alpicola Villeneuve, 1923 c g
C. arnolitra (Huckett, 1924) i c g
C. asperistilata Suwa, 1974 c g
C. asymmetrica Suwa, 2006 c g
C. beckeri Schnabl, 1911 c g
C. betuleti (Ringdahl, 1935) i c g b
C. bisinuata (Tiensuu, 1939) c g
C. cinerosa (Zetterstedt, 1845) i c g
C. consobrina (Huckett, 1929) i c g
C. crassiseta Stein, 1908 c g
C. delicata (Huckett, 1949) i c g
C. filicis (Huckett, 1949) i c g b
C. flavipennis (Fallén, 1823) i c g b
C. forcipispatula Xue, 2001 c g
C. frontata Suwa, 1983 c g
C. gleniensis (Huckett, 1924) i c g b
C. grandivillosa (Huckett, 1924) i c g
C. griseifrons (Séguy, 1923) c g
C. grossicauda Strobl, 1899 c g
C. hirtipedella Suwa, 1974 c g
C. histricina (Rondani, 1866) c g
C. holoptica Griffiths, 2004 c g
C. idahensis Stein, 1898 i c g
C. inspinata Suwa, 1983 c g
C. iobaeksana Kwon & Suh, 1982 c g
C. laticerca Fan, 1984 c g
C. latipennis (Zetterstedt, 1838) i c g
C. luteipennis (Ringdahl, 1950) c g
C. megacephala (Malloch, 1920) i c g
C. miyazakii (Suwa, 1974) c g
C. montana Pokorny, 1893 c g
C. nigripes Bezzi, 1895 c g
C. nodula Li, Cui & Fan, 1993 c g
C. nudisternata Suwa, 1974 c g
C. orthostylata Qian & Fan, 1981 c g
C. paucisetosa Deng, Li & Sun, 1987 c g
C. platyptera Griffiths, 2004 c g
C. proboscidalis (Malloch, 1920) i c g
C. pseudocinerosa Griffiths, 2004 c g
C. pusillans (Huckett, 1949) i c g b
C. rametoka (Suwa, 1974) c g
C. sapporensis Suwa, 1974 c g
C. setifer Huckett, 1972 i c g
C. shannoni Griffiths, 2004 c g
C. sichuanensis Feng, 1987 c g
C. sikisima (Suwa, 1974) c g
C. similata (Tiensuu, 1939) c g
C. sobaeksana (Kwon & Suh, 1982) c g
C. spatuliforceps (Fan & Chu, 1982) c g
C. spinosissima (Malloch, 1919) i c g
C. stratifrons (Huckett, 1949) i c g
C. styloplasis Zheng & Fan, 1990 c g
C. yukara Suwa, 1974 c g

Data sources: i = ITIS, c = Catalogue of Life, g = GBIF, b = Bugguide.net

References

Further reading

 

Anthomyiidae
Articles created by Qbugbot
Muscoidea genera
Taxa named by Camillo Rondani